Triphenylstibine is the chemical compound with the formula Sb(C6H5)3.  Abbreviated SbPh3, this colourless solid is often considered the prototypical organoantimony compound.  It is used as a ligand in coordination chemistry and as a reagent in organic synthesis.

Like the related molecules triphenylphosphine and triphenylarsine, SbPh3 is pyramidal with a propeller-like arrangement of the phenyl groups.  The Sb-C distances average 2.14-2.17 Å and the C-Sb-C angle are 95°.

SbPh3 was first reported in 1886, being prepared from antimony trichloride by the reaction:

6 Na + 3 C6H5Cl + SbCl3 → (C6H5)3Sb + 6 NaCl

An alternative method treats phenylmagnesium bromide with SbCl3.

References

Organoantimony compounds
Phenyl compounds